In mathematics, a positive-definite function is, depending on the context, either of two types of function.

Most common usage 
A positive semi-definite function of a real variable x is a complex-valued function  such that for any real numbers x1, …, xn the n × n matrix

is positive semi-definite (which requires A to be Hermitian; therefore f(−x) is the complex conjugate of f(x)).

In particular, it is necessary (but not sufficient) that

(these inequalities follow from the condition for n = 1, 2.)

A function is negative semi-definite if the inequality is reversed.  A function is definite if the weak inequality is replaced with a strong (<, > 0).

Examples
If  is a real inner product space, then ,  is positive definite for every : for all  and all  we have

As nonnegative linear combinations of positive definite functions are again positive definite, the cosine function is positive definite as a nonnegative linear combination of the above functions:

One can create a positive definite function  easily from positive definite function  for any vector space : choose a linear function  and define .
Then

Bochner's theorem

Positive-definiteness arises naturally in the theory of the Fourier transform; it can be seen directly that to be positive-definite it is sufficient for f to be the Fourier transform of a function g on the real line with g(y) ≥ 0.

The converse result is Bochner's theorem, stating that any continuous positive-definite function on the real line is the Fourier transform of a (positive) measure.

Applications

In statistics, and especially Bayesian statistics, the theorem is usually applied to real functions. In practice, one must be careful to ensure that the resulting covariance matrix (an  matrix) is always positive-definite. One strategy is to define a correlation matrix A which is then multiplied by a scalar to give a covariance matrix: this must be positive-definite. Bochner's theorem states that if the correlation between two points is dependent only upon the distance between them (via function f), then function f must be positive-definite to ensure the covariance matrix A is positive-definite. See Kriging.

In this context,  Fourier terminology is not normally used and instead it is stated that f(x) is the characteristic function of a symmetric probability density function (PDF).

Generalization

One can define positive-definite functions on any locally compact abelian topological group; Bochner's theorem extends to this context. Positive-definite functions on groups occur naturally in the representation theory of groups on Hilbert spaces (i.e. the theory of unitary representations).

Alternative definition

The following definition conflicts with the one above.

In physics, the requirement that  may be dropped (see, e.g., Corney and Olsen).

See also
 Positive-definite kernel

References
 Christian Berg, Christensen, Paul Ressel. Harmonic Analysis on Semigroups, GTM, Springer Verlag. 
 Z. Sasvári, Positive Definite and Definitizable Functions, Akademie Verlag, 1994
 Wells, J. H.; Williams, L. R. Embeddings and extensions in analysis. Ergebnisse der Mathematik und ihrer Grenzgebiete, Band 84. Springer-Verlag, New York-Heidelberg,  1975. vii+108 pp.

Notes

External links
 

Complex analysis
Dynamical systems
Types of functions